Yasmeen Hassan is a Pakistani attorney and international women's rights activist. She has served as the Global Executive Director of Equality Now since 2011.

Background 
Hassan was born and raised in Pakistan. In 1987, she moved to the United States to attend Mount Holyoke College, earning a BA, magna cum laude, Phi Beta Kappa in Political Science in 1991. She obtained her J.D. magna cum laude from Harvard Law School in 1994.

Hassan was inspired to become an advocate for women and girls when, at 10 years old, she saw how a change in Pakistan's laws effectively reduced women to second-class citizens.

Career 
Hassan is the author of "The Haven Becomes Hell: A Study of Domestic Violence in Pakistan," the first study on domestic violence in the country. The report was submitted to the World Conference on Women, 1995. She has clerked on the D.C. Court of Appeals and previously worked at Davis Polk & Wardwell. 

Her projects at the U.N. included global workshops on the Convention on the Elimination of All Forms of Discrimination Against Women. 

Hassan first became involved with Equality Now in 1999 when where she consulted on the organization's first Words and Deeds report, as part of the 1995 Beijing Platform for Action. Since then, Equality Now's advocacy has resulted in the repeal of over 50 sex discriminatory laws.  

She became Global Executive Director of Equality Now in 2011. Prior to her appointment, Hassan served as the organization's Deputy Executive Director and Director of Programs. Under her leadership, Equality Now has worked on a number of strategic litigation cases, with judgments that have set legal precedents and resulted in international and national legal reform. This included a civil case in the US under the Trafficking Victims Protection Act on behalf of Brazilian girls who were sexually exploited by a US-based sex tour operator, settled in 2015. The case resulted in actions from the Brazilian government to protect indigenous girls. 

Hassan spearheaded Equality Now's campaigning on discriminatory religious and customary laws, together with UN Women, Musawah, Act Church of Sweden, Femnet, Muslims for Progressive Values, Solidarity for African Women's Rights, Women's Learning Partnership and CLADEM, which was launched at the UN's Commission on the Status of Women in March 2020. 

Hassan's commentary has featured on CNN, Al Jazeera, and in The New York Times, The Washington Post, The Sunday Times, and The Huffington Post.

Hassan has been a member of the advisory board for Gucci's Chime For Change campaign since 2013. Hassan was previously a member of the advisory circle for the Women's Building in New York City.

Awards and recognition 
 Sakhi for South Asian Women Gender Justice Award, 2017
 Stanford Law School National Public Service Award, 2019
 Forbes' 50 over 50 women, 2021

References

External links
The Haven Becomes Hell: A Study of Domestic Violence in Pakistan"

Living people
Pakistani women's rights activists
Mount Holyoke College alumni
Harvard Law School alumni
Year of birth missing (living people)
21st-century American lawyers
21st-century American women lawyers